The county of Northumberland
is divided into 4 parliamentary constituencies
– 1 borough constituencies
and 3 county constituencies.

Constituencies

2010 boundary changes
Under the Fifth Periodic Review of Westminster constituencies, the Boundary Commission for England decided to retain Northumberland's constituencies for the 2010 election, making a very small change between Berwick-upon-Tweed and Hexham to realign constituency boundaries with the boundaries of current local government wards.

Proposed boundary changes 
See 2023 Periodic Review of Westminster constituencies for further details.

Following the abandonment of the Sixth Periodic Review (the 2018 review), the Boundary Commission for England formally launched the 2023 Review on 5 January 2021. Initial proposals were published on 8 June 2021 and, following two periods of public consultation, revised proposals were published on 8 November 2022. Final proposals will be published by 1 July 2023.

The commission has proposed that Northumberland be combined with the Tyne and Wear boroughs of Newcastle upon Tyne and North Tyneside as a sub-region of the North East Region, with the creation of two cross-county boundary constituencies, resulting in the abolition of Berwick-upon-Tweed, Blyth Valley and Wansbeck. The following seats are proposed in Northumberland:
Berwick and Morpeth
Blyth and Ashington
Cramlington and Killingworth (parts also in Newcastle upon Tyne and North Tyneside)
Hexham (part in Newcastle upon Tyne)

Results history 
Primary data source: House of Commons research briefing - General election results from 1918 to 2019

2019 
The number of votes cast for each political party who fielded candidates in constituencies comprising Northumberland in the 2019 general election were as follows:

Percentage votes 

11983 & 1987 - SDP-Liberal Alliance

* Included in Other

Seats 

11983 & 1987 - SDP-Liberal Alliance

Maps

Historical representation by party
A cell marked → (with a different colour background to the preceding cell) indicates that the previous MP continued to sit under a new party name.

1885 to 1918

1918 to 1950

1 original 1922 victor Hilton Philipson (National Liberal) declared void due to electoral fraud. Mabel Philipson won the subsequent by-election for the Conservatives.

1950 to 1983

1983 to present

See also
 List of parliamentary constituencies in the North East (region)
 History of parliamentary constituencies and boundaries in Northumberland

Notes

References

Northumberland
Politics of Northumberland
Parliamentary constituencies